The Angel of Scutari is a Big Finish Productions audio drama based on the long-running British science fiction television series Doctor Who.

Plot
In the Crimea, 1854, Hex meets his hero, Florence Nightingale.

Cast
Seventh Doctor – Sylvester McCoy
Ace – Sophie Aldred
Hex – Philip Olivier
Sir Sidney Herbert / Tzar Nicholas I – Hugh Bonneville
Florence Nightingale – Jeany Spark
William Russell / Russian DungeonGuard – John Paul Connolly
Brigadier-General Bartholomew ‘Barty’ Kitchen – Alex Lowe
Sir Hamilton Seymour – Sean Brosnan
Lev Tolstoy / Preston – John Albasiny

The Three Companions
The Three Companions bonus feature, Part 3.

The Gathernaut by Marc Platt

Cast
Polly – Anneke Wills
Thomas Brewster – John Pickard
Gerry Lenz/Announcer – Russell Floyd

Continuity
During this story, the exterior of the TARDIS is rendered white when a cannonball shatters its corporeal shell. It remains white for the next several stories, finally returning to blue in Black and White.
The spare TARDIS key hidden behind the "Police Box" P was first revealed in the 1996 TV movie.

Cast notes
Hugh Bonneville would later play Captain Avery in the Eleventh Doctor episode "The Curse of the Black Spot".

Critical reception 
Doctor Who Magazine reviewer Matt Michael criticised the underuse of both Tolstoy and Nightingale, but found that "its charms outweigh its flaws".

References

External links
Big Finish Productions – The Angel of Scutari

2009 audio plays
Seventh Doctor audio plays
Crimean War fiction
Fiction set in 1854